Khafizov is a Turkic masculine surname; its feminine counterpart is Khafizova. It is a slavicised version of Hafiz with suffix '-ov'. Notable people with the surname include:

 Oleg Khafizov (born 1959), Russian writer
 Vadim Khafizov (born 1970), Russian football coach

Turkic-language surnames